Mahmud Khan may refer to:
 Mahmud Khan, Iran, a village in Khuzestan Province, Iran
 Mahmud Khan (Moghul Khan) (1462–1508), Khan of Tashkent and of the Moghuls of western Moghulistan
 Shah Mahmud Khan (1890–1959), Prime Minister of Afghanistan, 1946–1953
 Mahmud Khan I, 18th-century ruler of Kalat in what is now the Balochistan province of Pakistan
 Sayyed Mahmud Khan (died 1573), Mughal general
 Mahmud Khan of Bengal, 17th-century Bengali nobleman